Bernard Genoud (22 February 1942 – 21 September 2010) was the bishop of the Roman Catholic Diocese of Lausanne, Geneva and Fribourg from his appointment on 18 March 1999, until his death on 21 September 2010. He was consecrated bishop on 24 May 1999. In 2008, Bishop Genoud publicly asked Swiss Catholics for forgiveness during the priest sex abuse scandal in the country.

Bernard Genoud was born on 22 February 1942 in Châtel-Saint-Denis, Switzerland. He was ordained a Catholic priest in 1968.  Bishop Genoud died on 21 September 2010 from lung cancer at a hospice in Fribourg, Switzerland, at the age of 68. His funeral was held at the Fribourg Cathedral on 25 September 2010.

See also

References

1942 births
2010 deaths
21st-century Roman Catholic bishops in Switzerland
People from the canton of Fribourg
Deaths from lung cancer